UET may refer to:

 Unitary executive theory, an American constitutional principle
 European University of Tirana
 Quetta International Airport, in Quetta, Balochistan, Pakistan
 European Trotting Union
 University of Engineering and Technology (disambiguation)